Business Application Programming Interface (BAPI) is used in mySAP to achieve business related functionalities. It is a remote-enabled function module which is provided by SAP.

Description
BAPIs enable access to SAP  functions across formal, stable and dialog-free interfaces. These interfaces can be used by external applications developed by customers and complementary software partners as well as by other SAP applications. Defined as API methods of SAP Business Object Types, these object types are used within the Business Framework to enable object-based communication between components.

Business objects and their BAPIs enable object orientation to be used in central information processing in companies. For example, existing functions and data can be re-used, trouble-free technical interoperability can be achieved and non-SAP components can be implemented. Applications can use BAPIs to directly access the application layer of the R/3 System and, as clients, applications can use the business logic of the R/3 System. BAPIs provide the client with an object-oriented view of the application objects without needing to know the implementation details. BAPIs are always developed by defining scenarios which are used to map and implement system-wide business processes.

References

Application programming interfaces
SAP SE